Jamie McKenzie (born 29 November 1980 in Bellshill)  is a Scottish former professional footballer. He played for Partick Thistle, Cowdenbeath, Albion Rovers, Stenhousemuir, Elgin City and Montrose in the Scottish Football League.

McKenzie also served as caretaker manager of Elgin City during the 2005–06 season at the age of 25. After moving into Junior football, McKenzie managed West Region side Gartcairn.

On 17 December 2019, McKenzie left Gartcairn.

References

External links 

1980 births
Living people
Footballers from Bellshill
Scottish footballers
Partick Thistle F.C. players
Cowdenbeath F.C. players
Albion Rovers F.C. players
Stenhousemuir F.C. players
Elgin City F.C. players
Bellshill Athletic F.C. players
Montrose F.C. players
Scottish football managers
Elgin City F.C. managers
Scottish Football League players
Scottish Junior Football Association players
Fauldhouse United F.C. players
Cumnock Juniors F.C. players
Vale of Clyde F.C. players
Forth Wanderers F.C. players
Scottish Football League managers
Association football midfielders
Scottish Junior Football Association managers